Blur Circle is a 2016 American drama film directed by Christopher J. Hansen, starring Cora Vander Broek and Matthew Brumlow.

Cast
 Cora Vander Broek as Jill Temple
 Matthew Brumlow as Burton Rose
 Ryan Artzberger as Earl Ambrose
 Jency Allison Weeks as Evvy Rose
 Elizabeth A. Davis as Heather
 Jordan Richard as Heather's Husband
 Robert Hagins as Henry
 Ava Hansen as Katie
 Clinton Pickens as Ned
 Toby Meuli as Mark Faxon
 Sam Henderson as Detective Samuels

Release
The film was released on 12 January 2018.

Reception
Frank Scheck of The Hollywood Reporter wrote that while film occasionally feels "overly manipulative", it "proves very moving at times", the storyline "refreshingly avoids going in predictable directions", the characterisations "become subtler and more nuanced", and the performances of Vander Broek, Brumlow and Artzberger are "first-rate".

Kimber Myers of the Los Angeles Times wrote that while the film has "good intentions", it "can’t compensate for characters that are often unlikable and unbelievable."

References

External links
 
 

American drama films
2016 drama films